The Philadelphia Skating Club and Humane Society is the oldest figure skating club in the United States.

History
The predecessor organization, called "The Skater's Club of the City and County of Philadelphia", was founded in 1849, and merged with the assets of the Humane Society of Philadelphia in 1861. The latter organization was patterned after the Royal Humane Society; the original purpose of the club was to patrol outdoor skating areas around the city of Philadelphia, such as the Schuylkill River, in order to rescue skaters who had fallen through the ice. Club regulations still require members to carry a reel of stout twine for lifesaving purposes while skating outdoors.

In 1921,the Philadelphia Skating Club and Humane Society was one of the seven original clubs which formed the United States Figure Skating Association. It is one of the few clubs in the United States that owns its own rink, located in Ardmore, Pennsylvania, which opened in 1938.

Today, the Philadelphia Skating Club and Humane Society retains its traditions of both on and off-ice social events and activities while  offering year-round recreational and competitive figure skating.

Notable skaters who have represented the club over the years include Dick Button, Scott Hamilton, and ice dance partners Kimberly Navarro and Brent Bommentre.

References

External links

Figure skating clubs in the United States
Sports venues in Philadelphia
1849 establishments in Pennsylvania
Clubs and societies in Philadelphia